Naram-Suen (also transcribed Narām-Sîn, Naram-Sin) was a king who ruled over Eshnunna for at least nine years during the later 19th century BCE, during its brief time of political power. He is known to be the son of Ipiq-Adad II, king of Eshnunna, and a contemporary of Shamshi-Adad I, king of the Kingdom of Upper Mesopotamia.

An inscription praying for the king's peace was found in Kythira.

References

See also
Naram-Sin of Akkad
Naram-Sin of Assyria

Kings of Eshnunna